The 2019 Limerick Senior Hurling Championship was the 125th staging of the Limerick Senior Hurling Championship since its establishment by the Limerick County Board in 1887. The championship began on 12 April 2019 and ended on 6 October 2019.

Na Piarsaigh were the defending champions.

On 6 October 2019, Patrickswell won the championship after a 1-17 to 0-15 defeat of Na Piarsaigh in the final at the LIT Gaelic Grounds. This was their 20th championship title overall and their first title since 2016.

Murroe-Boher's Seán Tobin was the championship's top scorer with 2-53.

Team changes

To Championship

Promoted from the Limerick Premier Intermediate Hurling Championship
 Garryspillane

From Championship

Relegated to the Limerick Premier Intermediate Hurling Championship
 Cappamore

Fixtures/results

Group 1

Table

Results

Group 2

Table

Results

Knock-out stage

Quarter-finals

Semi-finals

Final

Championship statistics

Top scorers

Top scorers overall

Top scorers in a single game

Championship statistics

Miscellaneous

Patrickswell win a record 20th title to go top of the Roll of Honour.

References

Limerick Senior Hurling Championship
Limerick Senior Hurling Championship
Limerick Senior Hurling Championship